Namthip Jongrachatawiboon (born 23 November 1982), or nickname Bee, is a Thai film and television actress, singer and model from Exact. Namthip started her career in entertainment industry at the age of 12 in advertising. She was introduced by Araya Indra - one of the famous fashion stylists in Thailand. Fashion shooting of JASPAL is her first job as a model since she was 14, followed by many fashion modelings and some music video shootings.
She became a singer in 1999 after the Rak Mak Ken Pai music video, she released her first album in 2000. She later transitioned into acting in 2001 in her first drama Lued Hong.

Filmography

Television

Film

Awards

TV program 
Poo Ying Teung Poo Ying Suay''

Mentor 
In The Face Thailand, she first appeared as a temporary coach for Chermarn Boonyasak in episode 9, helping the team win the campaign. She officially coached season 2 with Lukkade Metinee & Cris Horwang. Although she only officially joined " The Face Thailand " in season 2 and is the youngest coach but Bee was quickly impressed by the personality, not to lose anyone. Thus, the winner finally called her team Kanticha Chumma. Bee continued to accompany Season 3 along with Lukkade Metinee & Marsha Wattanapanich, which received much support from viewers who loved the show. In early 2018, she's back to be a mentor of The Face Thailand Season 4 All Stars again, and she is partner with Sririta Jensen, so the team name is TeamBeeRita.
 The Face Thailand (season 2) Champion
 The Face Thailand (season 3) Runner-Up
 The Face Thailand (season 4 All Stars) Runner-Up

Discography

Cover Version
2017:เดียวดายกลางสายลม (Cover Version Ost The Promise (2017 film))

Studio albums 
Unbravable Woman
B2 
B The Best 
OST-Prai Prattana 
Her Song

Music video 
1999: Rak Mak Kern Pai 
1999: Ying Tou Ying Suay Blackhead
1999: Spec 
1999: Mai Chai Luey 
2000: Tong Mai Rub 
2005: Tao Tee Mee 
2009: Mai Luer Hed Pol Ja Rak
None: ไม่เหลือเหตุผลจะรัก - แก้ม วิชญาณี
2013: ความเจ็บยังคงหายใจ - อ๊อฟ ปองศักดิ์
2015: Nick Studio54 - หยุดก่อน
2016: เปลวไฟ - Blackhead

References

External links 
http://www.beenamthip.com
  

Living people
1982 births
Namthip Jongrachatawiboon
Namthip Jongrachatawiboon
Namthip Jongrachatawiboon
Namthip Jongrachatawiboon
Namthip Jongrachatawiboon
Namthip Jongrachatawiboon
Namthip Jongrachatawiboon
Namthip Jongrachatawiboon